Kwon Jung-dong (10 September 1932 – 26 November 2021) was a South Korean politician. A member of the Democratic Justice Party, he served as Minister of Labor from 1980 to 1982 and in the National Assembly from 1985 to 1988.

References

1932 births
2021 deaths
Labor ministers of South Korea
Members of the National Assembly (South Korea)
Democratic Justice Party politicians